Mark Gray may refer to:

 Mark Gray (singer) (1952–2016), American country singer
 Mark Gray (skier) (born 1967), Australian Olympic skier
 Mark Gray (snooker player) (born 1973), English
 Mark Gray (photographer) (born 1981), Australian photographer
 Mark Gray (attempted assassin), traveling salesman who attempted to shoot actor Edwin Booth, 1879
 Mark Nicholas Gray, British Royal Marines officer

See also
Mark Grey, American classical music composer and sound engineer